Sid LeProtti (also spelled Le Protti) was a pianist and bandleader from Oakland, California active in the Barbary Coast. Born to an African American mother and Italian immigrant father, he was raised by his maternal grandparents. He learned classical piano music as a child from a German immigrant teacher. He first heard ragtime music around the age of 10. LeProtti led the So Different Jazz Band, the house band of the dance club of the same name in the Barbary Coast, from 1907 to 1917.

In addition to classical and ragtime music, LeProtti and other musicians in San Francisco clubs during the early 20th century played round dances like mazurkas, waltzes, two-steps, marches, polkas, and schottisches.

Later in life, LeProtti was interviewed by George Avakian and Turk Murphy about his life and music.

See also
West Coast Dixieland Revival

References

1886 births
1958 deaths
Dixieland jazz musicians
20th-century American musicians
20th-century American male musicians
Jazz musicians from California
American jazz bandleaders
American male jazz musicians
Musicians from California
Music of California
Music of the San Francisco Bay Area
Musicians from the San Francisco Bay Area
Musicians from Oakland, California
African-American pianists
20th-century African-American musicians